Eugenio D'Ursi (born 7 May 1995) is an Italian football player who plays as a forward for  club Crotone.

Club career
He made his professional debut in Lega Pro for Aversa Normanna in the 2014–15 season and spent the first seven seasons of his senior career in Serie C and Serie D.

In July 2019, his rights were bought by Serie A club Napoli. On 30 July 2019, Napoli loaned him to Serie C club Bari on a 2-year term.

On 3 August 2021, he joined Pescara on loan. On 22 August 2022, D'Ursi was loaned to Foggia, with an option to buy.

On 6 January 2023, D'Ursi signed with Crotone.

References

External links
 

1995 births
Footballers from Naples
Living people
Italian footballers
Association football forwards
S.F. Aversa Normanna players
S.S. Arezzo players
A.S. Bisceglie Calcio 1913 players
U.S. Catanzaro 1929 players
S.S.C. Napoli players
S.S.C. Bari players
Delfino Pescara 1936 players
Calcio Foggia 1920 players
F.C. Crotone players
Serie C players
Serie D players